Herbert Laumen (born 11 August 1943) is a German former professional footballer who played as a striker.

He scored more than 120 Bundesliga goals.

Laumen won two caps for the West Germany national team in the late 1960s.

Honours
Borussia Mönchengladbach
 Bundesliga: 1969–70, 1970–71

References

External links
 
 
 

1943 births
Living people
German footballers
Association football forwards
Germany international footballers
West German footballers
Bundesliga players
Borussia Mönchengladbach players
SV Werder Bremen players
1. FC Kaiserslautern players
Ligue 1 players
FC Metz players
Sportspeople from Mönchengladbach
Footballers from North Rhine-Westphalia
West German expatriate footballers
West German expatriate sportspeople in France
Expatriate footballers in France